John Österholm may refer to:

John Österholm (politician)
John Österholm (footballer)